Bell County School District is the school district for Bell County, Kentucky, United States.

It is the largest of the three districts in the county. It operates a total of 7 schools, 6 PreK-8 school centers and 1 high school (9th-12th grades). In the 2020–21 school year, it had a total student enrollment of 2,451 students. In 2017–2018, the district's budget was $32,451,000. Its most notable achievements were the 1991 and 2008 state football championships, Class AAA and the cheerleading team going to State in 2008–2011.

Schools
 Bell County High School, grades 9–12. Their mascot is the bobcat.
 Bell Central School Center, grades K-8. Their mascot is the bulldog. 
 Frakes School Center, grades K-8. Their mascot is the bear. 
 Lone Jack School Center, grades K-8. Their mascot is the mustang.
 Page School Center, grades K-8. Their mascot is the wildcat. 
 Right Fork School Center, grades K-8. Their mascot is the panther. 
 Yellow Creek School Center, grades K-8. Their mascot is the longhorn.

See also 
 WYJR-LP: District-owned radio station

References

School districts in Kentucky
Education in Bell County, Kentucky